Parviturbo alboranensis is a species of sea snail, a marine gastropod mollusk in the family Skeneidae.

Description
The height of the shell attains 0.9 mm, its diameter 1.2 mm.

Distribution
The species was found off the Isla de Alborán in the western Mediterranean Sea.

References

alboranensis
Gastropods described in 2006